Calamity Jane was the name of a 10" LP album, released by Columbia Records (as catalog number CL-6273) on November 9, 1953, of songs sung by Doris Day and Howard Keel from the movie of the same name. In the UK, the album was also released as a 10" minigroove album by Philips Records, catalogue number BBR8104.

One of the tracks on this album, "Secret Love," was also released as a single and became a major hit, reaching #1 on all charts. The album itself reached #2 on the Billboard magazine album charts.

The album was combined with Day's 1951 album, I'll See You in My Dreams, on a compact disc, issued on June 12, 2001, by Collectables Records.

Track listing
All songs with lyrics by Paul Francis Webster and music by Sammy Fain; all songs are solos by Doris Day except where otherwise noted.
 

Although all songs were performed in the movie, only "The Deadwood Stage", "I Can Do Without You", "Higher Than A Hawk", and "Secret Love" were directly recorded from the movie soundtrack; all others were especially recorded for the album.

1953 soundtrack albums
Doris Day soundtracks
Columbia Records soundtracks
Philips Records albums
Howard Keel albums
Western film soundtracks
Musical film soundtracks